Elton Watkins (July 6, 1881 – June 24, 1956) was a Congressman representing Oregon's 3rd congressional district for one term from 1923 to 1925. The son of a Confederate soldier, Watkins also served as an assistant U.S. Attorney.

Early life
Watkins was born in Newton, Mississippi on July 6, 1881. His father was a veteran of the Confederate Army, and the younger Watkins was educated at the Webb School in Bell Buckle, Tennessee before attending college at Washington and Lee University in Virginia, where he graduated in 1910 with a Bachelor of Arts. Watkins then went on to law school at Georgetown where he earned an LL.B.  Then in 1912, he graduated with a master's degree from George Washington University Law School. During part of his time in Washington, DC he worked for the Federal Bureau of Investigation.

Oregon
Also in 1912 he moved to Oregon where he was admitted to the state bar. During World War I he returned to the FBI and in 1918, married Daniela Ruth Sturgis. The couple had two children. In 1919, he became an assistant attorney for the United States District of Oregon.  Then in 1922 he won election as a Democrat to the United States House of Representatives from Oregon’s 3rd congressional district. He lost his re-election bid in 1924.

Later life
In 1930 Watkins was the Democratic nominee for U.S. Senate, but lost to incumbent Charles L. McNary. Then in 1932, he ran again and lost in the primary. Also in 1932, he ran and lost a bid to be Portland’s mayor. He tried a second time for the mayors office in 1940 and lost. He then returned to the practice of law in Portland, where he died on June 24, 1956. He was buried in Greenwood Hills Cemetery.

References

This article incorporates material from the public domain Biographical Directory of the United States Congress.

1881 births
1956 deaths
People from Newton, Mississippi
Webb School (Bell Buckle, Tennessee) alumni
Georgetown University Law Center alumni
Washington and Lee University alumni
George Washington University Law School alumni
Democratic Party members of the United States House of Representatives from Oregon